The Minotaur class, also known as the Swiftsure class after the lead ship was sold to Canada and renamed, were a group of light cruisers of the British Royal Navy built during the Second World War. They were designed as a modified version of the  incorporating war modifications and authorised in 1941. However, in spite of the heavy toll of cruisers in that year and the following one, the building of this new class had a relatively low priority and only three of the planned twelve were completed by end of World War II. They played no significant part in the Second World War, though Swiftsure, as flagship of the British Pacific Cruiser Squadron, was selected by Admiral Cecil Harcourt to hoist his flag for the Japanese surrender at Hong Kong.

Design
The class was originally to have consisted of twelve ships,  six were laid down in 1941–1942 and the seventh unit, Hawke, in 1943. Four of the ordered cruisers were cancelled almost immediately, three in March 1942 being replaced by the first light fleet carrier order, which used half the Fiji/Swiftsure  power train in split form and another Swiftsure/Minotaur probably Mars was cancelled in November 1942 and a eighth cruiser Bellerpophon, was actually started in early 1944, and then stopped and cancelled with its already constructed boilers and turbines being installed in the light fleet carriers Colossus and Perseus (ex Edgar) being constructed in the same Vickers Armstrong yard as Bellerephon had been started as a Swiftsure. Minotaur was transferred to the Royal Canadian Navy and renamed Ontario. While the basic specifications and original armament were only a slight enlargement of the Fiji class with an extra twin 4-inch turret, the Minotaurs did represent a substantial advance towards more sophisticated weapon control and integration of command and control and AIO and developments towards operation room control of fighting ships. By 1944 the seven Minotaurs under construction represented four distinct groups, which were so significantly different that they should probably be regarded as four separate classes of cruiser. Swiftsure introduced the reliable Type 274 lock-and-follow radar, which increased the accuracy of the main armament to get on target quickly. The second Superb extended this more advanced radar with the addition of Type 275 for anti-aircraft fire control, although Superbs version lacked the flyplane or the accurate finishing in the version fitted to later s. These guns and those for Hawke, the fourth Tiger, were nearly complete by late 1946 and were stored at Rosyth until the late 1950s as alternatives to the Mk 26 automatic twin 6-inch guns that were eventually fitted. Hawke represented a further development, surprisingly scrapped on the slip in late 1945, with its boilers and machinery complete, and its guns nearly finished.

Three of the laid-up vessels were completed in the 1960s as s. Two were given helicopter facilities and anti-aircraft missile systems to become "helicopter and command cruisers" during the 1970s.

Modifications
Swiftsure was completed with sixteen twin and six single 20 mm guns, but had all the singles and eight of the twins removed in the summer of 1945, when she received, in lieu, eight 40 mm Bofors and five single 40 mm Bofors Mk III. HMCS Ontario (ex-Minotaur) was completed with the same close-range outfit as Swiftsure, and is reported to have had an outfit of six 40 mm and six 20 mm guns at the end of the war, all in single mountings. Superb was not completed until after the end of hostilities, and had a close-range outfit consisting of eight single 40 mm Mk III, two single 2-pounders, four twin hand-operated 20 mm and two single 20 mm guns.

The work on Swiftsure was largely completed. However, it was placed in reserve rather than fitted out with the only available armament, which was its original and labour-intensive triple 6-inch guns, two twin 4-inch guns, and a pair of L/60 Bofors which would have been controlled by a six-channel MRS8 US supplied fire control system. The 1953 plan to modernize the ship with the new twin 3-inch 70 calibre guns  was rejected around 1954 because Swiftsure′s beam of  did not allow enough space, and the cost of a full reconstruction of Superb as a fourth Tiger, with its full new armament, was considered too expensive. The new 70 calibre twin 3-inch mounts were experimental, and it was far from clear that they would ever be reliable enough to be effective. A more limited update of the Swiftsure and Superb  with new L/70  Bofors firing proximity fused shells was approved and then cancelled, because the time and cost of Swiftsure′s modernisation was proving too great, and it was clear that fitting the four L/70 mounts would require conversion from DC to AC power, which was considered too expensive on half-life ships. Options of the Type 965 radar on its new lattice mast and a data link were considered. The cost of finishing the Tiger-class cruisers (£35 million) was a major political issue, as was the new automatic guns jamming. The jamming issue was partly rectified by 1958, but only after inflicting terminal damage to the credibility of the project. The completion of Lion and Blake was in real danger of being stopped in early 1960, and automatic gun cruisers were considered obsolete in the United States and the Soviet Union. Problems with cracking that occurred in the update of Swiftsure as a result of the collision with the destroyer Diamond slowed the refit, raised costs, and made recommissioning at the same time as Belfast impossible. Re-entering service in 1960 with only Second World War-era cruiser weapons was too expensive, but there were no suitable modern weapons to fit, and more than £1 million had already been spent on the Swiftsure 'reconstruction' project by early 1959, mainly on structural modifications rather than improved weapons and electronics.
In 1959-60, the Royal Navy fought hard to retain Swiftsure as a new modernization pattern of a cruiser - helicopter carrier. This was intended to allow more space on carriers for fighters and strike aircraft.

Ships

Notes

References

External links
Minotaur class at Uboat.net
WWII cruisers

Cruiser classes
 
Ship classes of the Royal Navy